The Locust Grove/R.E. Luttrell Farmstead is a historic farmstead at 24 Bunree Lane in Amissville, Virginia.  The main house of the  farm is an I-house plan timber frame structure built c. 1815.  It was extended in the 19th century with a two-story addition to the side, and again in 1960 with a modern two story addition to the rear.  The core of the house has retained much of its interior decoration and woodwork.  The farmstead includes a number of outbuildings, including a tenant house dating to the turn of the 20th century, and c. 1920 stallion barn, chicken house, and meat house.  A c. 1830s barn collapsed due to a heavy snow load in 2011.  The original owner of the farmstead is not known; its longest tenure of ownership was by the interrelated Corbin, Bywaters, Nelson, Luttrell, and Amiss families.

The property was added to the National Register of Historic Places in 2013.

References

Farms on the National Register of Historic Places in Virginia
Houses completed in 1815
Houses in Rappahannock County, Virginia
National Register of Historic Places in Rappahannock County, Virginia